Ongerup is a town  south-east of Perth and  east of Gnowangerup in the Great Southern region of Western Australia. At the 2016 census Ongerup had a population of 93.

History 
The name Ongerup means "place of the male kangaroo" in the local Noongar language.

The area around Ongerup was explored by Surveyor General John Septimus Roe who passed through in 1848. In the 1870s the Moir family moved to the area and began grazing sheep along the Warperup Creek. In 1910 the land was surveyed into  blocks priced at 10 shillings per acre before the townsite was gazetted in 1912.

A local newspaper, The Gnowangerup Star and Tambellup-Ongerup Gazette, was launched on 21 August 1915 with the final edition being printed in 2003.

The first Ongerup Public Hall was built in 1927 but was replaced by the current building in 1953.

During the Great Depression of the 1930s, kangaroo hunters and mallee bark strippers came to the area. The bark was sent to Germany for use in tanning.

In 1936 the town established a football club. The club initially played in the Tambellup Football Association before joining with Jerramungup to form the Ongerup Football Association in 1962. The club went into recess in 2010.
 
The town was flooded when  of rain, almost a third of the annual average, fell in one day on 17 February 1955.

In June 1983 the Ongerup Cemetery received its first burial.

In 1983 the Ongerup Shears event was held for the first time. This was a shearing competition that was held on the Queen's Birthday long weekend with international and national shearers competing in the runup to the Perth Royal Show. The event was discontinued in the 1990s.

In 2009 a 13-part documentary, entitled The Life of the Town, was made by Ronin Films that looked at the life of the town and focussed on the Australian Rules football team that was under threat.

In March 2010 the Ongerup Police Station (established 1962) was moved  to the east to Jerramungup in response to the increased populations of Jerramungup and Bremer Bay.

In 2012 the town celebrated its centenary with a programme of various events.

Railway 

A  branch line to Ongerup from Tambellup on the Great Southern Railway main line between Perth and Albany was opened on 6 January 1913 to serve the growing agriculture industry; it closed on 13 October 1957. A timetable from 1937 shows two trains per week leaving Ongerup on Tuesdays at 06:55 and Fridays at 04:00. Lengthy connections of around 12 hours were available at Katanning for Perth, arriving approximately 30 hours after leaving Ongerup. In 1918 a barracks was constructed on Eldridge Street for railway workers based in Ongerup. The building survived the closure of the railway and now houses the Ongerup/Needilup District Museum that was opened in 1978.

Ongerup today 
At the 2016 census Ongerup had a population of 93 people, a 22% decrease from the 2006 census. The town is home to a pub, general store, tyre service, primary school, kindergarten, telecentre, caravan park, ambulance service, 18-hole golf course, sports oval and pavilion and roadhouse.

A war memorial commemorates the 63 Ongerup lives lost in World War I, World War II, the Korean War and the Vietnam War.

At the sports oval Australian Rules football, hockey and netball are played in winter and cricket, tennis, lawn bowls and basketball are played in summer.

Mark Williams, former AFL player with Hawthorn, played for Ongerup Football Club as a junior player.

Economy 
The town exists to service the local agricultural community. Surrounding farms mainly produce wheat, barley, canola and wool, while lesser quantities of lupins, oats, alfalfa and other crops are also grown. Beef cattle, fat lambs, and pigs are sideline industries.

Grain silos belonging to Cooperative Bulk Handling are located at Ongerup and during harvest time these silos store grain from surrounding farms before it is transported to Albany by road for export.

Attractions 
The town is home to the Malleefowl Preservation Group and in 2007 the Yongergnow Australian Malleefowl Centre was opened.

The Ongerup Wildflower Show is held in September and October each year. The Ongerup district is known to be home to over 1,300 species of wildflowers.

Ongerup is a stop on the Transwa bus service between Perth and Esperance.

References

External links

 Hidden Treasures of the Great Southern
 Albany Gateway

Towns in Western Australia
Great Southern (Western Australia)
Grain receival points of Western Australia